Val-du-Maine is a commune in the department of Mayenne, western France. The municipality was established on 1 January 2017 by merger of the former communes of Ballée (the seat) and Épineux-le-Seguin.

See also 
Communes of the Mayenne department

References 

Communes of Mayenne